"Therapy" is a song by American singer T-Pain that features rapper Kanye West, which is from Pain's third studio album, Three Ringz (2008).

Background
The track wasn't the first of T-Pain and Kanye's work together, since West featured Pain on his 2007 single "Good Life". Around two weeks after the release of the album which features "Therapy", West released his fourth studio album 808s & Heartbreak, which T-Pain believes was influenced by him.

Commercial performance
On November 29, 2008, the song debuted and peaked at number 6 on the US Bubbling Under Hot 100 and number 74 on the Digital Songs chart. This made it the only non-single from Three Ringz to enter any Billboard chart.

Charts

References

2008 songs
T-Pain songs
Kanye West songs
Songs written by T-Pain
Songs written by Kanye West
Songs written by Frank Romano